José Roque (born 1909) is a Cuban former Negro league outfielder who played in the 1920s.

A native of Havana, Cuba, Roque played for the Cuban Stars (West) in 1929. In 43 recorded games, he posted 38 hits with three home runs and 19 RBI in 166 plate appearances.

References

External links
 and Seamheads

1909 births
Date of birth missing
Year of death missing
Cuban Stars (West) players
Baseball outfielders
Baseball players from Havana